The Luzerne County Manager heads the executive branch of the Luzerne County government. The manager is appointed by the Luzerne County Council. The manager directs the county's organizational, management, and administrative operations and activities. The current acting manager is Brian Swetz.

History
Luzerne County voters rejected home rule proposals in the past (once in 1974 and again in 2003). However, from 2008 to 2010, corruption plagued the county government. Three county judges, a county commissioner, a clerk of courts, a deputy chief clerk, and a director of human resources faced criminal charges. These events persuaded the voters of Luzerne County to adopt a new form of government. On Tuesday, November 2, 2010, a home rule charter was adopted by a margin of 51,413 to 41,639.

On Monday, January 2, 2012, the previous government (the board of county commissioners) was abolished and replaced with the new form of government (council–manager government). The first members of the Luzerne County Council were sworn in that same day. The assembly consists of eleven elected members. They appoint and work alongside a full-time manager. The manager oversees the county's day-to-day operations. In the beginning, Tom Pribula served as the interim county manager. Several weeks later, the council appointed the first county manager (Robert Lawton).

Serving "at the pleasure of county council"
According to the home rule charter, the manager “shall serve at the pleasure of county council.” In other words, the council has the power to appoint and remove the manager. Each ordinance, resolution, and policy established by county council should be faithfully executed by the county manager. The manager may make recommendations to the council, but does not have the authority to vote on or veto any legislation originating from the assembly.

List of county managers

References

Luzerne County, Pennsylvania
Government of Luzerne County, Pennsylvania